The Yuma Panthers was the initial moniker of the minor league baseball team based in Yuma, Arizona, US from 1950 to 1956. Yuma played as a member of the Class C level Sunset League in 1950, Southwest International League from 1951 to 1952 and Arizona–Mexico League in 1955 and 1956. The Yuma Sun Sox were an affiliate of the Cincinnati Reds in 1956.

Notable alumni
 Frank Gabler
 Ed Mayer

References

Baseball teams established in 1950
Defunct Arizona-Mexico League teams
Defunct Southwest International League teams
Defunct Sunset League teams
Yuma, Arizona
Baseball teams disestablished in 1952
1950 establishments in Arizona
Professional baseball teams in Arizona
Defunct baseball teams in Arizona